Pipavav is located at latitude 20°54'N and longitude 71°30'E on the coast of Gujarat, India. By road it is 2 hours (85 km) from Amreli, 30 minutes (20 km) from Rajula city, 2.5 hours (130 km) from Bhavnagar on the east and 1.5 hrs (89 km) from Diu in the west.

Pipavav is the name of village which is used while naming the name of Port Pipavav, the first private sector port in India. Two Goliath gantry cranes of Reliance-Shipyard and the Port Pipavav portainer cranes are landmarks in that area.

The nearest town to Pipavav is Rajula City which is 22 km away.

History

The name 'Pipavav' has two parts, the name Pipa originates from the name of Saint Pipaji, who was a king from Rajasthan, left his kingdom in search of the eternity along with his queen Sitadevi. Vav in Gujarati refers to a well. Pipavav village is still having a well which was dug by Saint Pipaji. A temple of Radha and Krishna is in the village, there is a saying that the idols were obtained during the digging process of the well than.

Villagers mentions the importance of the place during the Mahabharata time, wherein Krishna, with Rukmini while going to Dwarks, halted in Pipavav. Preacher Morari Bapu did a Ramkatha at Pipavav to collect fund for the development of Pipavav temple.

References

 Adapted from the Wikinfo article, "Pipavav" http://www.internet-encyclopedia.org/wiki.php?title=Pipavav
 "Pipavav eyes Indian Navy contracts after FIPB nod" http://www.dnaindia.com/money/report_pipavav-eyes-indian-navy-contracts-after-fipb-nod_1523909

External links
 Port Pipavav home page
 Home page of Reliance-Shipyard
 Pipavav, a modern scrap yard waiting for orders, report of a visit by Greenpeace (archive.org 2004-02-03)

Cities and towns in Amreli district
Port cities in India